The women's U23 individual time trial at the 2007 European Road Championships took place on 19 July. The Championships were hosted by the Bulgarian city of Sofia. The course was 24 km long and the race started in the morning.

Final classification

References

2007 European Road Championships
European Road Championships – Women's U23 time trial
2007 in women's road cycling